Acea is a surname. Notable people with the surname include:

Eusebio Acea (born 1969), Cuban rower
Francis Acea (born 1967), Cuban artist
John Adriano Acea (1917–1963), American jazz pianist
Raidel Acea (born 1990), Cuban sprinter and middle distance runner

See also
ACEA (disambiguation)